Verkh-Borovlyanka is a rural locality (a settlement) in Rebrikhinsky District of Altai Krai, Russia, located on the Priobskoye Plateau. Population: 238 (2010).

History
It was founded in 1926.

Climate
Verkh-Borovlyanka has a humid continental climate (Dfb) with frigid winters, warm to hot summers, and relatively low precipitation.

Rural localities in Rebrikhinsky District